Yuko Fujii (born 6 May 1990) is a Japanese table tennis player. Her highest career ITTF ranking was 94.

References

1990 births
Living people
Japanese female table tennis players